Workswell is a Czech company producing thermographic cameras, pyrometers and video cameras for the control of processes, construction, for the device diagnostics, maintenance of machines etc. The company headquarters are in Prague, branches are in Kutná Hora, Rožnov pod Radhoštěm and in the Slovak town Žilina. The customers include companies ČEZ, RWE, Bosch, Honeywell, Tesco, Heineken, Kofola, IKEA, Net4Gas, Semikron, ArcelorMittal, Vítkovice power engineering etc.

In the survey of the Hospodářské noviny daily newspaper, the Workswell company received 3 awards in 2018:
"Company of the Year in Prague"
"Responsible Company of the Year"
"The Most Profitable Company".

References 

Article contains translated text from Workswell on the Czech Wikipedia retrieved on 23 November 2018.

External links 
Homepage

Technology companies of the Czech Republic
Unmanned aerial vehicles of the Czech Republic
Technology companies established in 2010
Czech companies established in 2010